is a sports video game developed by WOW Entertainment and published by Sega for the Dreamcast in 2000.

It was the first game in the modern series to be featured on the Dreamcast, and was the spiritual successor to World Series Baseball for the Sega Genesis. It was released in July 2000 to coincide with the 2000 Major League Baseball All-Star Game in Atlanta.

World Series Baseball 2K1 was the first game in the series since World Series Baseball '98 in 1997. Sega had announced that a World Series Baseball game would be a launch title for the Dreamcast's 1998 release, but the Dreamcast launched without any baseball games.

Reception

The game received "generally unfavorable reviews" according to the review aggregation website Metacritic. Rob Smolka of NextGen said of the game, "If lifelike graphics are what you want, save yourself $60 and turn on ESPN; the gameplay isn't worth a dime."

The game was a runner-up for GameSpots annual "Most Disappointing Game" award among console games, which ultimately went to Shenmue. The staff called the former "lackluster" and noted that Sega was "well known for producing superior sports games".

Notes

References

External links
 

2000 video games
Dreamcast games
Dreamcast-only games
Sega video games
World Series Baseball video games
Video games developed in Japan
Multiplayer and single-player video games